Boon is an unincorporated community and census-designated place (CDP) in Wexford County in the U.S. state of Michigan.  The community is located within Boon Township.  The population of the CDP was 90 at the 2020 census.

As an unincorporated community, Boon has no legal autonomy of its own but does have its own post office with the 49618 ZIP Code.

History
Boon was first settled as early as 1888 as a station on the Toledo, Ann Arbor, and Northern Michigan Railroad.  The community was platted in 1889 and received its first office on December 19, 1899.

The community of Boon was listed as a newly-organized census-designated place for the 2010 census, meaning it now has officially defined boundaries and population statistics for the first time.

Geography

Demographics

Education
The community of Boon is served by two separate school districts.  Residents may attend Cadillac Area Public Schools in Cadillac to the southeast, while others might attend Mesick Consolidated Schools in Mesick to the northwest.

Images

References

Unincorporated communities in Wexford County, Michigan
Unincorporated communities in Michigan
Census-designated places in Wexford County, Michigan
Census-designated places in Michigan
Populated places established in 1889
1889 establishments in Michigan